The Nevada State Athletic Commission (also known as the Nevada Athletic Commission or NSAC) regulates all contests and exhibitions of unarmed combat within the state of Nevada, including licensure and supervision of promoters, boxers, kickboxers, mixed martial arts fighters, seconds, ring officials, managers, and matchmakers. The commission is the final authority on licensing matters, having the ability to approve, deny, revoke, or suspend all licenses for unarmed combat.

The commission was established in 1941. It has several times been criticized for its conduct and sentences, and has several times been labelled a "kangaroo court".

Leadership
The Nevada State Athletic Commission is an agency of the Nevada Department of Business & Industry and is made up of five part-time commissioners (known as the "Commission"), an executive director, and seven full-time employees.

Each commissioner is appointed by the Governor for a three-year term.  The Governor also selects one of the five commissioners to be the chairperson.  The current chairperson is Stephen J. Cloobeck and the other commissioners, are Staci Alonso, Anthony A. Marnell III, Christopher Ault, and Jim Murren.
  
The Commission appoints an executive director, who conducts the day-to-day operations of the agency but does not have a vote on actions taken by the Commission.  Voting is held at commission meetings that typically occur once a month and are governed by Nevada's Open Meeting Law (OML).  The executive director is Jeff Mullen.

The Office of Nevada Attorney General serves as legal counsel to the agency.

Codified laws and administrative regulations
The Nevada Athletic Commission codified laws are defined in the Nevada Revised Statues (NRS): Chapter 467 – Unarmed Combat and the codified administrative regulations are defined in Nevada Administrative Code (NAC): Chapter 467 – Unarmed Combat, with Amendments to NAC Chapter 467, LCB File No. R062-16, effective September 9, 2016.

Duties
The responsibilities of the commission include ruling in disciplinary cases and arbitrating disputes between combatants and managers brought pursuant to Nevada Administrative Code § 467.102(4).  Additionally, the commission is charged with the responsibility of promulgating regulations to implement and enforce the state laws governing unarmed combat.

For all main event championship bouts and special events, the commission must assign the referee, judges and doctors to work the contest.  In all other contests or exhibitions, the executive director is responsible for assigning the referee, judges and doctors, ensuring that a contestant is not on suspension status in Nevada or another jurisdiction, approving each bout and determining that a contestant is not being mismatched with a superior opponent, issuing licenses and collecting fees from the sale of tickets.

UNLV student death
The commission oversaw an inquiry into the death of University of Nevada, Las Vegas student Nathan Valencia in an unsanctioned Kappa Sigma fraternity “Fight Night” charity event on November 20, 2021, and commissioned an investigation into the matter by the Investigations Division of the Nevada Attorney General’s Office. The results of the investigation were discussed at an August 23, 2022 meeting of the Athletic Commission in which Commission Chairman Stephen J. Cloobeck and other commissioners pressed officials from the Las Vegas Metropolitan Police Department and the Clark County district attorney’s office to explain why they didn’t dig deeper into the incident. The Attorney General’s report concluded, “Law enforcement statements that no crime had been committed were conclusory and premature, and compromised any possible future prosecutions.” 

The commission had previously unanimously passed what it called “Nathan’s Law” that requires emergency safety measures and trained referees be in place for amateur boxing matches and unarmed combat, with potential criminal prosecution for violations of the law.

Criticism

Nick Diaz
On September 14, 2015, UFC Fighter Nick Diaz was suspended for 5 years and fined $165,000. The commission relied on a single positive cannabinoid urinalysis result, out of three tests taken within a few hours of each other. Of the tests, the two returning negative results were the only two conducted by a WADA approved lab. Diaz, a medical marijuana patient, has since received widespread support from the MMA community; fans and fighters alike. The vast majority of reactions have condemned the commission, looking at a number of factors including: the drug-testing process, the ignoring of the evidence by the commission and the overly harsh, arguably personally-motivated punishment levied. Nick Diaz and his lawyers plan to appeal the decision via Judicial Review.

McGregor fining
In October 2016, UFC fighter Conor McGregor was fined $150,000, five percent of his purse for UFC 202, as well as sentenced to fifty hours of community service, due to his involvement in an incident of bottle-throwing at a pre-fight press conference between him and opponent Nate Diaz and entourage; commissioner Pat Lundvall said that McGregor was "to be taught a lesson" and "humbled as it relates to dealing with the public." The $150,000 fine is to be divided between an anti-bullying campaign and the state's general fund; McGregor is also charged with hearing fees. Originally, the attorney general's office proposed a $25,000 fine; the majority of the commission members, however, felt that that amount would not have any significant impact on McGregor; Lundvall originally suggested a 10 percent fee, matching the sentence of Jon Jones and Daniel Cormier.

The sentence was seen by many as too harsh, and criticisms were directed towards the NSAC for its bias and alleged lack of objectivity, as well as its level of unchecked power. McGregor responded by saying he would never fight in Nevada again, and expressing doubts on whether he'll pay. President of the UFC Dana White also reacted to the harsh sentence; supporting McGregor, White commented that the sentence may be harmful for the state of Nevada, commenting: "Conor McGregor hit me [up] yesterday and said, 'I don't ever want to fight in Nevada again. Ever.' Now how does that make sense for the state of Nevada? You're gonna try to fine this kid ... that much money, it just makes people not wanna come fight in our state. And that's not a good thing. And guess what? Conor McGregor doesn't need Nevada, he can fight anywhere. He can fight in Iowa, okay. We can put his fight on an island off a coast of anywhere. It just makes no sense for the state and it's terrible."

See also

 Association of Boxing Commissions
 List of Nevada state agencies

References

External links
 Official Site of the NSAC

Athletic Commission
Athletic commissions in the United States
Boxing in Nevada
Government agencies established in 1941